Naipura is a Village of Tanda Ambedkar Nagar, Uttar Pradesh. Naipura is Tehsil of Tanda and  It belongs to Faizabad division. Located 26 km toward north from District headquarter Akbarpur, Ambedkar Nagar, 13 km from Tanda, and 200 km from state capital Lucknow. The villagers mostly speak the Hindi local language.

Notable people
Sanju Devi is a Bharatiya Janata Party politician of Tanda, Uttar Pradesh
Azimulhaq Pahalwan is a Samajwadi Party politician

Caste
Naipura has a substantial population of Scheduled Caste people. They constitute 25.92% of total population in Naipura village. The village does not have any Scheduled Tribe population.

Demographic
Naipura had a population of 3156, of which 1602 were male and 1554 female at the time of the 2011 Census of India. The children with age 0–6 is 509 which makes up 16.13% of total population of village. The Average Sex Ratio was 970, which is higher than Uttar Pradesh state average of 912. The Child Sex Ratio was 1012, higher than Uttar Pradesh average of 902.

Transportation
The nearest railway station is about  distant.

Weather
In Naipura, climate of summer (March to July) temperatures can range from 30 to 40 degrees Celsius. Winter climate (November to January) temperatures can range from 10 to 20 degrees Celsius.

Nearby villages
Aliganj
Kurram Nagar
Asopur

See also

List of villages in India

References

External links
Bpl census data of ambedkar nagar

Villages in Ambedkar Nagar district